Maria's Mon (April 24, 1993 – September 14, 2007) was an American Thoroughbred racehorse that was the champion two-year-old colt in 1995 and produced two Kentucky Derby winners.

Maria's Mon was foaled in Kentucky on April 24, 1993 at the farm of Morton Rosenthal.  He was sired by Wavering Monarch out of Carlotta Maria. Carlotta Maria was sired by the Irish stallion Caro. Maria's Mon was retired from racing due to a broken ankle.

Maria's Mon was retired to Pin Oak Stud and is the sire of Kentucky Derby winners Monarchos (2001) and Super Saver (2010). His stud fee in 2007 was $60,000 for a live foal and he covered 132 mares in his last season. Maria's Mon died of severe laminitis, which may have resulted from equine Cushing's syndrome,  on September 14, 2007 at Hagyard Equine Medical Institute in Lexington, Kentucky.

References

1993 racehorse births
Racehorses bred in Kentucky
2007 racehorse deaths
Eclipse Award winners
Thoroughbred family 1-l